The 1927–28 Irish Cup was the 48th edition of the premier knock-out cup competition in Northern Irish football. 

Willowfield won the tournament for the 1st and only time in their history, defeating Larne 1–0 in the final replay at Windsor Park after the first match ended in a 1-1 draw. 

Willowfield became the first junior side to win the Irish Cup, a feat which has to date only been repeated by Dundela (1955) and Carrick Rangers (1976).

Results

First round

|}

Replay

|}

Second replay

|}

Quarter-finals

|}

Semi-finals

|}

Replay

|}

Final

Replay

References

External links
 Northern Ireland Cup Finals. Rec.Sport.Soccer Statistics Foundation (RSSSF)

Irish Cup seasons
1927–28 domestic association football cups
1927–28 in Northern Ireland association football